Leonardo Bates (born November 28, 1989) is an American football offensive lineman who is currently a free agent. He played college football at University of Louisiana at Lafayette and attended L.W. Higgins High School in Marrero, Louisiana. He has been a member of the New Orleans VooDoo, Portland Steel and Tampa Bay Storm.

College career
Bates played for the Louisiana–Lafayette Ragin' Cajuns from 2008 to 2012. He was the team's starter his final two and a half years and helped the Ragin' Cajuns to 27 wins. He played in 45 games during his career including 7 starts at guard and 27 at tackle. Bates was a two-time All–Sun Belt Conference performer for the Ragin' Cajuns. While at Louisiana–Lafayette, Bates was a General Studies major. He earned a bachelor's degree in Applied Science.

Professional career

New Orleans VooDoo
Bates was assigned to the New Orleans VooDoo on January 22, 2014. Bates appeared in 12 games for the VooDoo as a rookie. On September 24, 2014, Bates' rookie option was picked up by the VooDoo. Bates started 12 games for the VooDoo in 2015.

Portland Steel
On February 5, 2016, Bates was assigned to Portland Thunder. Bates missed a few July games on injured reserve. On August 4, 2016, Bates was placed on inactive reserve, where he would finish the season.

Tampa Bay Storm
Bates was assigned to the Tampa Bay Storm on April 6, 2017. The Storm folded in December 2017.

Atlantic City Blackjacks
On April 16, 2019, Bates was assigned to the Atlantic City Blackjacks.

Personal life
Bates was born in a family of four children to a father named Ernestine. Bate's siblings include one sister named Maria and two brothers named Steafan Horne and Jwann. Since 2020, Bates has worked as a high school biology teacher at Collegiate Academies in his hometown of New Orleans.

References

External links
Louisiana–Lafayette Ragin' Cajuns profile

Living people
1989 births
Players of American football from New Orleans
American football offensive linemen
Louisiana Ragin' Cajuns football players
New Orleans VooDoo players
Portland Steel players
Tampa Bay Storm players
Atlantic City Blackjacks players